Emilio Guardado also known as Milo, was a former Salvadoran football coach.

Honours
International
Central American and Caribbean Games Bronze Medal (1): 1935

External links
  (highlighted one of the earliest coaches of alianza)

Salvadoran footballers
Salvadoran football managers
Year of birth missing
Central American and Caribbean Games bronze medalists for El Salvador
Competitors at the 1935 Central American and Caribbean Games
Association footballers not categorized by position
Central American and Caribbean Games medalists in football